Solorina saccata, commonly called chocolate chip lichen, is a lichen growing on calcareous rocks, usually in crevices and always in sheltered conditions. It is found from the mediterranean mountains up to the arctic. It differs from other alpine Solorina-species by the four two-cell spores in the asci.

Taxonomy

It belongs to the genus Solorina of the family Peltigeraceae. It is also confused with Solorina simensis (Hochst. ex Flotow) in spore ornamentation and chemical properties as well as in its mainly plane apothecia and blue-green photobiont.

References

Peltigerales
Lichen species
Taxa named by Carl Linnaeus
Lichens of Europe
Lichens described in 1755
Lichens of the Arctic